Kribi is a beach resort and sea port in Cameroon.

Location
The coastal town of Kribi lies on the Gulf of Guinea, in Océan Department, South Province,  at the mouth of the Kienké River. The coordinates of Kribi are: 2° 56' 6.00"N, 9° 54' 36.00"E (Latitude: 2.9350; Longitude: 9.9100)

Overview

It has an estimated population of 55,401. It services sea traffic in the Gulf of Guinea and also lies near the terminus of the Chad-Cameroon pipeline. The Lobé Waterfalls are nearby and there is a road inland, through the Littoral Evergreen Forest, as far as Bipindi and Lolodorf where native communities of Pygmies are found.

Kribi Power Station
The 216 MW plant that cost US$390 million (CFA:176.3 billion) to build, came on line in 2013. It is now owned by Globeleq A second phase expansion is planned.

Port 
Since there is no natural harbour at Kribi, the port itself would be several kilometres offshore where deepwater of at least  is suitable for large Capesize ships. It is also the location for the Kribi Lighthouse.

By 2017, the port  development had started, and by 2020 the port was being developed by Louis Berger.

The port will be served by railways of two different gauges, 1435mm and 1000mm. There will be a new 130km rail link between the port and the existing metre gauge network at Edéa.  Dual gauge sleepers could be installed so that the new lines are compatible with the proposed African Integrated High Speed Rail Network (AIHSRN).

Iron mine 
The iron ore will come from mines near Mbalam.  The mine would have an output of approximately 35 million tonnes per year, with a 30-year or so lifespan. An alternate site for this port is at Lolabé. This line would be an extension of existing metre gauge lines (1000mm). In 2021, a contract was let to build the rail line to Mbalam.

Bauxite mine 
It is proposed to connect the port of Kribi to a new bauxite mine in the north of Cameroon at Minim, Martap with a metre gauge (1000mm) railway. A link line junctions from the Camrail line at Edéa and proceeds 130km to Kribi.

International relations

Twin towns – Sister cities
Kribi is twinned with:
 Ouistreham, France
 St-Nazaire, France

Climate
Kribi has a tropical monsoon climate (Köppen climate classification Am). Due to its equatorial position, Kribi sees a short, fairly dry season and a long, very wet season. The hottest month, February, has an average high temperature of 32 C (89.6 F), and an average low of 25 C (77 F). The wettest month, September, sees  of rain. 27 of the 30 days in September see rain. The driest month, December, sees  of rain. The coldest month is August, with an average high of 28 C (82.4 F), and a low of 23 C (73.4 F). Humidity remains high year-round.

Great things to do

Kribi is renowned for its popular beach locations in Ngo'e and near the Lobé Waterfalls. Kribi is equally very popular for its roasted fish. Fishermen typically come in from the sea on week-ends and sell fresh fishes that tourists can then buy and have roasted in many restaurants around the beach. The nightlife especially in places in like Big-BEN is also among some of the exciting things to do in Kribi.

Gallery

See also 
 Communes of Cameroon
 Océan
 South Province (Cameroon)
 Transport in Cameroon

References

External links 

Populated places in South Region (Cameroon)